Adult Contemporary is a chart published by Billboard ranking the top-performing songs in the United States in the adult contemporary music (AC) market.  In 2009, seven different songs topped the chart in 52 issues of the magazine, based on weekly airplay data from radio stations compiled by Nielsen Broadcast Data Systems.

At the start of the year, the number one position was held by Faith Hill with her song "A Baby Changes Everything", retaining its position from the final chart of 2008.  It held the top spot for a single week in 2009 before being replaced by David Cook's song "The Time of My Life".  Cook's song, his "coronation single" after winning the previous year's season of American Idol, had spent 11 weeks in the top spot in 2008 and thus finished with a total of 15 weeks at number one.  Following Cook's run at number one, British band Coldplay topped the chart for a single week with "Viva La Vida", which won the Grammy Award for Song of the Year at the 51st Annual Grammy Awards held on February 8.

From mid-February on, only four songs topped the chart, spending 46 weeks between them at number one.  In the issue of Billboard dated February 14, Jason Mraz's song "I'm Yours" reached number one, beginning a run of 16 consecutive weeks in the top spot, the longest of the year.  The song built airplay gradually across various radio formats, and finally topped the AC chart a full year after its initial release in February 2008.  Despite holding the top spot for four months, "I'm Yours" remains Mraz's only song to reach number one on the Adult Contemporary chart.  In June, teenage country music singer Taylor Swift replaced Mraz in the top spot with "Love Story", her first AC number one.  The song was released in two different versions to country and pop radio, a pattern repeated later in the year with her single "You Belong with Me", which also topped the AC chart.  Following Swift's six-week run at number one, another teenage vocalist took the top spot as Miley Cyrus' "The Climb" began a run of 15 consecutive weeks atop the chart.  Taken from the soundtrack of Hannah Montana: The Movie, in which she starred, "The Climb" is Cyrus' only song to date to reach number one on the Adult Contemporary chart.  Cyrus' run at number one ended in the issue of Billboard dated October 31, when Swift returned to the top spot with "You Belong with Me", making her the only artist to achieve two AC number ones in 2009.  Swift's song held the number one position for the remainder of the year.

Chart history

See also
2009 in music

References

2009
Number-one adult contemporary singles
United States Adult Contemporary